George Lambert may refer to:

Politicians 
George Lambert, 1st Viscount Lambert (1866–1958), British MP and peer
George Lambert, 2nd Viscount Lambert (1909–1989), his son, also a British MP and peer 
George Lambert (Australian politician) (1879–1941), Australian politician in Western Australia
George Lambert (American politician) (born 1968), American politician in New Hampshire

Sportsmen 
George Lambert (tennis) (1842–1915), British real tennis world champion
George Lambert (footballer) (born 1889), Australian footballer, played for Fitzroy Football Club
George Lambert (cricketer) (1919–1991), English cricketer
George Lambert (pentathlete) (1928–2012), American Olympic modern pentathlete

Others 
George Lambert (English painter) (1700–1765), English landscape painter
George Jackson Lambert (1794–1880), English organist
George Lambert (Royal Navy officer) (1796–1869), British admiral
George Lambert (VC) (1819–1860), Irish recipient of the Victoria Cross
George Washington Lambert (1873–1930), Australian painter
George Lambert (baritone) (1900–1971), English baritone mainly active in Canada